Sphingomonas laterariae  is a Gram-negative, rod-shaped and non-motile bacteria from the genus of Sphingomonas which has been isolated from a dump site which was contaminated with hexachlorocyclohexane in Ummari in India.

References

Further reading

External links
Type strain of Sphingomonas laterariae at BacDive -  the Bacterial Diversity Metadatabase

laterariae
Bacteria described in 2012